Queen Elizabeth High School (QEH) was a secondary school in Halifax, Nova Scotia. QEH was known for its high academic standards, competitive sports teams and distinguished extra-curricular activities such as its annual model parliament and musical productions. Its Reach for the Top team won the CBC-TV national championship in 1975.

Queen Elizabeth High School was part of the Halifax community for 65 years, and offered many services and facilities including a 1280-seat performance auditorium that opened in 1951. QEH closed in 2007, merging with longtime rival St. Patrick's High School to form Citadel High School.

History
Queen Elizabeth High School was formed by a merger of two former schools, the Halifax Academy and Bloomfield High School, which were considered overcrowded and outdated. It was built during World War II on Camp Hill, facing Robie Street, and opened on 2 September 1942. The new school was named after Queen Elizabeth (popularly known after 1952 as the Queen Mother), who had visited Halifax in 1939 with King George VI.

Queen Elizabeth was registered as a designated school for children of the United States Armed Forces and Diplomatic Corps, and had a long tradition of attracting students from other parts of Canada as well as from overseas.

Live!, the first live album released by legendary Canadian rock and roll band April Wine, was recorded in the QEH auditorium in 1974.

Queen Elizabeth High School was merged with nearby St. Patrick's High School to form Citadel High School. The new school is located across the street from the former site of Queen Elizabeth, adjacent to Citadel Hill. Ground breaking for Citadel High School took place in April 2006, and the final classes at QEH finished in June 2007. Queen Elizabeth closed as the academically top-ranked high school in Nova Scotia (based on the Atlantic Institute for Market Studies annual rankings of high schools).

The building was demolished in 2011, and its former land was transferred to the Province of Nova Scotia. During the demolition, workers discovered an unmarked, sealed copper time capsule behind the school's cornerstone. Opened in September 2011 at Citadel High School, the capsule contained newspapers, school planning documents, and other paraphernalia from 1941.

Over the short term, a community garden has been developed on the site and includes a walking path from Robie Street to Bell Road. In the future, the land is slated to be developed by the Nova Scotia Health Authority as an expansion to the neighbouring Queen Elizabeth II Health Sciences Centre.

Queen Elizabeth High School hosted numerous successful reunions in its history and one final reunion, the "Last Chance Reunion" took place from July 27 to 29, 2007.

Campus
Queen Elizabeth High School occupied a sloping site on the corner of Bell Road and Robie Street, popularly known as the "Willow Tree" intersection. The sprawling school building, located opposite the Halifax Common and the Quinpool Road commercial district, was built in phases from the 1940s to 1960s. It had four teaching levels as well as a clock tower.

Though the school was originally planned to include a gymnasium and auditorium, construction of these facilities was deferred due to the war and a lack of funds. Work began in 1950, and the gym and auditorium were opened in 1951. Erminie was the first musical presented in the new auditorium.

The first phase of the school, as well as the subsequent gym/auditorium addition, were designed by architect C.A. Fowler (1891–1950) of Halifax.

More classrooms were added in the late 1950s, but the school remained overcrowded into the 1960s. The authorities discussed a variety of options to deal with the problem including adding another storey to the school, building a new high school in the north end, or building an extension to QEH. They finally settled on the latter option, and in February 1969 the Board of School Commissioners opened an addition along Bell Road that more than doubled the school's size.

Queen Elizabeth High School's facilities included a library, art rooms, music rooms, technology education shops, science laboratories, computer laboratories, family studies rooms, a reading resource room, a learning support centre, an ESL centre, a gymnasium, an auditorium and a full-service cafeteria – all of which were accessible to the physically challenged.

Model parliament
Queen Elizabeth High School had one of the oldest-running high school model parliaments in all of North America, founded in 1952. This became one of the most prized traditions of the school and continues at Citadel High School.

Previous opposition leaders and prime ministers

2007: Edgar Burns (Liberal) and Zephyr Armsworthy (Conservative)
2006: Shenglong Gao (Conservative) and Marc Trussler (Liberal)
2005: Aaron Ingersoll (Conservative), and James Mosher (Liberal)
2004: Kaitlin Pianosi (Conservative) and James Mosher (Liberal)
1994: Neil MacFarlane (PM-Reform) and Jacob Zimmer (LO-NDP)
1990: Michael S. Mahon (PM Conservative) and JA Mahon Party Whip
1989: Brian Macdonald (PM NDP) and Heather Fitzgerald (LO Liberal)
1988: Derek Hall (PM NDP) and Heather Fitzgerald (LO Liberal)
1987: Derek Hall (PM NDP) and Karla Francis (LO Liberal)

Athletics

Basketball

At the Nova Scotia high school level during the 1980s, QEH was the most dominant high school team in the province, winning several provincial titles as well as other tournaments across Canada. Bob Douglas, who has become a local basketball coaching legend, headed the team. Douglas died in 2008, but his coaching success at QEH spanned three decades and he coached or influenced perhaps most of the best players that came from Nova Scotia over that period. In the 1980s alone, the QEH Lions won four consecutive provincial titles and Douglas was officially recognized by the National Association of Basketball Coaches. The Nova Scotia high school league in general was very competitive, and by the midpoint of the 1980s, basketball had become the most popular sport for both girls and boys at the high school level.

Football

The QEH Lions football team had a storied history, and ranks amongst the most successful high school programmes in Canada.  Head Coach Mike Tanner was the 1999 recipient of the NFL Canada Youth Coach of the Year Award. Tanner, a former QEH Lions player himself, also taught High School Physical Education throughout his career as head coach of the football team. Many other former Lions players also returned as coaches including Jeff Lawley, who coached defence from the 1990s until the programme was merged with that of Saint Patrick's at Citadel High. Queen Elizabeth Lions provincial football championships include:

2005: - QEH Lions 49 vs Cobequid Educational Centre Cougars 9
2004: - QEH Lions 32 vs Cobequid Educational Centre Cougars 17
2002: - QEH Lions 12 vs Cobequid Educational Centre Cougars 7
1998: - QEH Lions 39 vs Saint Patrick's High School Irish 6
1995: - QEH Lions 20 vs Prince Andrew High School Panthers 17
1994: - QEH Lions 28 vs Prince Andrew High School Panthers 0
1988: - QEH Lions W vs Cobequid Educational Centre Cougars L
1987: - QEH Lions
1986: - QEH Lions
1985: - QEH Lions
1983: - QEH Lions
1982: - QEH Lions
1981: - QEH Lions
1980: - QEH Lions
1978: - QEH Lions
1973: - QEH Lions
1970: - QEH Lions
1969: - QEH Lions

Musicals

2007: Titanic: A New Musical
2006: Guys and Dolls
2005: My Fair Lady
2004: Jane Eyre
2003: State Fair
2002: Hello Dolly!
2000: Titanic
1999: The Pajama Game
1998: Annie
1997: Oklahoma!
1996: Faust
1995: Damn Yankees
1994: Fiddler on the Roof
1993: Oliver!
1992: Carousel
1989: Now Let's Revue
1988: Kiss Me, Kate
1987: My One and Only
1986: The Music Man
1985: The Pajama Game
1984: Guys and Dolls
1983: West Side Story
1982: Bye Bye Birdie
1981: Bells are Ringing
1980: Brigadoon
1979: Guys and Dolls
1978: South Pacific
1977: Irene
1976: Oklahoma!
1975: Anything Goes
1974: Salad Days
1973: The Music Man
1968: Get Up and Go
1967: Tell it to Sweeney
1966: Our Girls
1963: The Curious Savage
1962: The Red Mill
1961: The Pirates of Penzance    The Happiest Days of Our Life
1960: Life With Father
1959: Four To Go
1958: Father of the Bride
1957: The Solid Gold Cadillac
1956: Robin Hood    Time Out for Ginger
1955: The Winslow Boy
1954: The Fortune Teller    Cheaper by the Dozen
1953: Martha/Julius Caesar
1952: The Romance of Cinderella    The Chimes of Normandy    You Can't Take It With You
1951: Erminie

Notable alumni

 Rick Black – Canadian Football League (CFL) player
 Philip Bryden '71 – Alberta deputy minister of justice and deputy solicitor general
 George Elliott Clarke '78 – poet/professor
 David Crabbe – Canadian Football League player
 Melanie Doane – singer/songwriter
 Ray Downey – Olympic boxer
 Andy Fillmore '84 – current member of parliament for Halifax and Parliamentary Secretary to Canada's Minister of Infrastructure and Communities
 Walter Fitzgerald '54 – former mayor of Halifax and first mayor of Halifax Regional Municipality
 Nancy Garapick '79 – Olympic swimmer (Montreal 1976 - won two bronze medals)
 Jenn Grant '98 – singer/songwriter
 Rob Harris '81 – Canadian men's curling champion '04 ("Brier"), world championships bronze medal-winner '04, Canadian mixed curling champion '02
 Ron James '76 – comedian
 Stephen Kimber '67 – journalist
 Labi Kousoulis '89 – Liberal MLA
 Michael Leir – High Commissioner to Australia
 Martha MacDonald '68 – economist
 Alexa McDonough – former leader of the Nova Scotia New Democratic Party (1980–1994) and New Democratic Party (1995–2003)
 Sarah McLachlan '86 – singer/songwriter
 Steve Morley '99 – former NFL football player and CFL (1st overall draft pick) offensive lineman
 Elliot Page '05 – actor (X-Men: The Last Stand and Juno)
 Glenn Sarty (dropped out) – television producer
 Russell Smith '81 – author and journalist
 Wade Smith – educator
 Warren Spicer '96 – Plants and Animals member
 Don Tremaine (dropped out) – longtime CBC personality
 Jonathan Torrens '90 – actor, television personality
 Hetty van Gurp '67 – founder, Peaceful Schools International
 Tyrone Williams – National Football League and Canadian Football League player
 Matt Woodley '96 – Plants and Animals member

Notes

References

External links
 
QEH Last Chance Reunion Website
QEH Class of 1971 web site

1942 establishments in Nova Scotia
2007 disestablishments in Nova Scotia
High schools in Halifax, Nova Scotia
Educational institutions established in 1942
Educational institutions disestablished in 2007
Schools in Halifax, Nova Scotia